The Chicago Freeze was a Tier II junior A ice hockey team in the North American Hockey League's West Division. The team was originally the Detroit Freeze until it relocated to a Chicago suburb of Geneva. The Chicago Freeze played out of the Fox Valley Ice Arena, which later became home to the Chicago Hitmen of the NAHL.

Regular season

Notable alumni
Craig Anderson , goaltender: 1998–99 season
Jason Bacashihua , goaltender: - 1999–2000 and 2000–01 seasons
Chris Conner, right wing: 2000–01 and 2001–02 seasons
George Parros, right wing: 1998–99 season
John Scott, defenseman: 2001–02 season

References

External links
Official website of the NAHL
Official website of Fox Valley Ice Arena

Defunct North American Hockey League teams
Freeze
Ice hockey clubs established in 1997
Ice hockey clubs disestablished in 2003